This Time Around is the second extended play from Tedashii. Reach Records released the EP on March 4, 2016.

Critical reception

Awarding the EP four and a half stars at New Release Today, Dwayne Lacy states, "(He loved) the ambition that Tedashii showed with this EP, taking risks that paid off! To see how Tedashii is still only getting better serves as a standard for artists, mainstream or underground, sacred or secular." Chris Major, giving the EP three stars from The Christian Beat, writes, "This Time Around under-delivers."

Track listing

Chart performance

References

2016 EPs
Reach Records albums
Albums produced by Gawvi